Escape from Kathmandu  is a 1989 collection of novellas by American writer Kim Stanley Robinson, about a group of American expatriates in Nepal.

Contents
The novellas are:

 Escape from Kathmandu ( nominated for Nebula Award for Best Novella in 1986 and the Hugo Award for Best Novella in 1987)
 Mother Goddess of the World
 The True Nature of Shangri-La
 The Kingdom Underground
 

1989 short story collections
Novels by Kim Stanley Robinson
American fantasy novels
Novels set in Nepal
Tor Books books
1989 American novels